Ménil-Hubert-sur-Orne (literally Ménil-Hubert on Orne) is a commune in the Orne department in north-western France.

See also
 Communes of the Orne department

References

Menilhubertsurorne